In 2014–15 season the club competed in both parts of Basketball League of Serbia and Radivoj Korać Cup.

Basketball league of Serbia 
The club began the season without any high ambitions and they surprised many people after winning the first 10 games, before losing to OKK Beograd in the 11th round. During the season two leading players Stefan Pot and Božo Đumić left the club. They still managed to bring in the young and talent Jovan Novak who quickly became one of the best players in the league. Vojvodina finished the season with 17 victories and 5 loses on the 3rd place.

Serbian Superleague 
In the second part of the season Vojvodina continued to go strong and won 3 games in a row following the 1st round loss against Metalac Valjevo, before losing to Partizan at home. They finished the season in the 5th place with the score 6–8.

Players

Depth chart

Left club during the season 
Stefan Pot (to CSU Asesoft Ploiești)

Božo Đumić (to KK Partizan)

Joined club during the season 
Jovan Novak (Free Agent)

Marko Radonjić (from Napredak Kruševac)

Statistics

Basketball league of Serbia 

Vojvodina